Germaine Levant (born 14 December 1978 in Zaandam) is a Dutch footballer who played for Eerste Divisie club Stormvogels Telstar during the 1999-2003 football season.

References

External links
voetbal international profile

1978 births
Living people
Dutch footballers
Footballers from Zaanstad
SC Telstar players
Eerste Divisie players
Association footballers not categorized by position